The 8th Women's Boat Race took place on 8 March 1941. The contest was between crews from the Universities of Oxford and Cambridge and held on the River Thames.

Background
The first Women's Boat Race was conducted on The Isis in 1927.   No race took place the previous year.

Race
The contest was won by Oxford by six seconds.  The victory took the overall record in the competition to 7–2 in their favour.

References

External links
 Official website

Women's Boat Race
1941 in English sport
March 1941 sports events
Boat
Boat
1941 sports events in London